Oberschule am Elsengrund was a school in Mahlsdorf in Berlin, Germany. The school was founded in 1983 as a school for Polytechnique. After the reunification of Germany it became a comprehensive school. This school moved away in summer 1993 and in August of the same year it became a gymnasium (school) which is not existing anymore. It had about 750 students taught by around 50 teachers.

Foreign languages taught were English, French, Latin and Spanish.

External links

Oberschule am Elsengrund (in German)

Defunct schools in Berlin
Educational institutions established in 1983
1983 establishments in Germany
Marzahn-Hellersdorf